The 2015–16 season was Udinese Calcio's 36th season in Serie A and their 21st consecutive season in the top-flight. Having missed out on European football for the second consecutive season, Udinese competed only in Serie A and in the Coppa Italia. Udinese finished 17th in the league following a poor season, and were eliminated in the round of 16 in the Coppa Italia.

Following the end of the season club and Italian football legend Antonio Di Natale retired.

Players

Squad information

Transfers

In

Loans in

Out

Loans out

Contract extensions

Pre-season and friendlies

Competitions

Serie A

League table

Results summary

Results by round

Matches

Coppa Italia

Statistics

Appearances and goals

|-
! colspan=14 style="background:#dcdcdc; text-align:center"| Goalkeepers

|-
! colspan=14 style="background:#dcdcdc; text-align:center"| Defenders

|-
! colspan=14 style="background:#dcdcdc; text-align:center"| Midfielders

|-
! colspan=14 style="background:#dcdcdc; text-align:center"| Forwards

|-
! colspan=14 style="background:#dcdcdc; text-align:center"| Players transferred out during the season

Goalscorers

Last updated: 15 May 2016

Clean sheets
Last updated: 15 May 2016

References

Udinese Calcio seasons
Udinese